Little Cedar Lake is a lake in Southeastern Wisconsin; United States. It is located at the geographic center of Washington County, in the Town of West Bend, and Town of Polk. Its source is Cedar Creek which flows into the northwest side of the lake, and its outflow is Cedar Creek, which continues to flow south at the bottom a small dam at the extreme southern tip of the lake. Spring, summer and autumn activities on the lake include boating, fishing, and water skiing. In winter the lake freezes over completely with ice up to 36 inches thick, Winter activities on the lake include ice fishing and snowmobiling. Many species of fish are found in Little Cedar Lake, including northern pike, walleye, rock bass, smallmouth bass, bluegills, carp, and bullheads. The Lake is located approximately  NNW of Milwaukee, and  SW of the City of West Bend.

References

External links
Map of Little Cedar Lake from the Wisconsin Department of Natural Resources
Little Cedar Lake Protection & Rehabilitation District

Lakes of Washington County, Wisconsin
Tourist attractions in Washington County, Wisconsin